Cabbage patch may refer to:

 Cabbage Patch, California, an unincorporated community in Yuba County, California, US
 Cabbage Patch, Dublin, also known as the Cabbage Garden, a park and former burial ground in Dublin, Ireland
 Cabbage Patch Kids, a line of dolls
 Cabbage Patch, a dance involving putting the hands together in the form of fists and moving them in a horizontal, circular motion
 A plot of land on which cabbage is grown
 Twickenham Stadium, a stadium in Twickenham, London, UK

See also
Cabbage
Cabbage (disambiguation)